Torre Santa Susanna is a comune in the province of Brindisi in Apulia, on the south-east Italian coast in the Salento peninsula.

Its main economic activities are tourism and the growing of olives and grapes.

History
The Romans had two forts built here after the Second Punic War. According to tradition, in the 3rd century AD a Roman soldier wrote the name of Saint Susanna on one of these towers ("Torre" in Italian), hence the name. After a series of plagues and earthquakes, population from the nearby hamlet took refuge here, giving birth to the current town.

References

Cities and towns in Apulia
Localities of Salento